The lira (plural lire; abbreviation: VAL) was the currency of the Vatican City between 1929 and 2002. It was not a separate currency but an issue of the Italian lira; the Banca d'Italia produced coins specifically for Vatican City.

History
The Papal States, by the late 1860s, was reduced to a small area close to Rome, used its own lira between 1866 and 1870 as a member of the Latin Monetary Union. Upon the conclusion of the Risorgimento, the state, and its currency, ceased to exist. In 1929, the Lateran Treaty established the State of the Vatican City and, according to the terms of the treaty, a distinct coinage was introduced, denominated in centesimi and lire, on par with the Italian lira. Italian coins and banknotes were legal tender in the Vatican City. The Vatican coins were minted in Rome and were also legal tender in Italy and San Marino.

In 2002, the Vatican City switched to the euro at an exchange rate of 1 euro = 1,936.27 Lire. It has its own set of euro coins.

Coins 

The development of Vatican coins largely mirrored the development of the Italian lire coins.

In 1929, copper c.5 and c.10, nickel c.20 and c.50, 1 Lira and 2 Lire, silver 5 Lire and 10 Lire, and gold 100 Lire coins were introduced. In 1936, the gold content of 100 Lire coins was decreased from 0.2546 to 0.1502 troy ounces. In 1939, aluminium bronze replaced copper and, in 1940, stainless steel replaced nickel. Between 1941 and 1943, production of the various denominations was reduced to only a few thousand per year.

In 1947, a new coinage was introduced consisting of aluminium 1 Lira, 2 Lire, 5 Lire and 10 Lire. The sizes of these coins were reduced in 1951. In 1955, stainless steel 50 Lire and 100 Lire were introduced, followed by aluminium-bronze 20 Lire in 1957 and silver 500 Lire in 1958. The 1 Lira and 2 Lire ceased production in 1977, followed by the 5 Lire in 1978. Aluminium-bronze 200 Lire were introduced in 1978, followed by bi-metallic 500 Lire and 1,000 Lire in 1985 and 1997, respectively. The 50 Lire and 100 Lire were reduced in size in 1992.

Beginning in 1967, the Vatican began issuing coins using Roman numerals for the year of issue, as opposed to the more common Arabic numerals.

Vatican lire coins were discontinued after the advent of the euro.

Vatican City has frequently issued its coins in yearly changing commemorative series, featuring a wide variety of themes. While most of these were sold in the form of uncirculated mint sets, a portion of Vatican coins were released into general circulation.

Circulating coins from Pius XI to Pius XII papacies (1929-1958)

See also

 Economy of Vatican City
 Index of Vatican City–related articles
 Philatelic and Numismatic Office of the Vatican City State
 Vatican euro coins

References

Currencies of Vatican City
Modern obsolete currencies
Currencies replaced by the euro
Currencies of Europe
1929 establishments in Vatican City
2002 disestablishments in Vatican City